Stewart Cameron (11 February 1920 – 31 January 2001) was a New Zealand cricketer. He played in five first-class matches for Canterbury from 1940 to 1956.

See also
 List of Canterbury representative cricketers

References

External links
 

1920 births
2001 deaths
New Zealand cricketers
Canterbury cricketers
Cricketers from Blenheim, New Zealand